Jocks and Burnouts: Social Categories and Identity in the High School is a 1989 book-length ethnographic study of social class in a Detroit high school written by sociolinguist Penelope Eckert.

Further reading

External links 

 

1989 non-fiction books
Ethnographic studies of education
English-language books